Gao Lu (born 8 October 1982) is a Chinese actress best known for her roles in The Lady Iron Chef, Mature Male Develop a Mind, My Economical Man, and All Is Well.

Early life and education
Gao was born in Beijing on October 8, 1982. She graduated from the Central Academy of Drama.

Acting career
Gao made her television debut in Youth is Like a Dream (1999), playing the monitress.

In August 2004, she appeared in Seven Swordsmen, playing the servant girl of Li Xiaoran's character. It is based on the wuxia novel written by Liang Yusheng.

In April 2005, Gao participated in the wuxia television series There is the Weapon of the Tear Stain as the wife of Chang Yue's character.

Gao was cast as Wen Qaing in the historical television series My Bratty Princess, which is set to premiere on January 25, 2006. That same year, she played Jin Yan in Wang Shuo's television adaptation Bloom of Youth, costarring Tong Dawei, Bai Baihe, Chen Yufan and Wen Zhang.

In 2007, Gao played the female lead opposite Guo Jinglin in Where Have All The Flowers Gone, a television drama in memory of the 70th Anniversary of the victory of the Long March. That same year, she had a guest appearance in The Lady Iron Chef, directed by Wong Jing.

Gao played the female lead role in the romantic comedy television series My Economical Man (2012), alongside Tong Liya, Li Guangjie, Du Chun, Qi Wei and Qiao Renliang. She also had a lead role in the drama television series, Rules Before A Divorce.

In 2013, she took the lead role in New Age of Love, opposite Yao Di and Ren Zhong.

In 2014, Gao had a supporting role in Our Second Child, a drama television series starring Jiang Xin and Monica Mok. She also landed a guest starring role on Woman in a Family of Swordsman opposite actress Tong Liya.

Gao starred with Li Guangjie, Tong Liya, Zhao Ziqi and Gao Yalin in the comedy television series Kuba Qiaoma (2015).

In 2017, Gao appeared in Surgeons, a medical drama starring Jin Dong and Bai Baihe.

Gao played a supporting role as Lin Qinshuang in the historical television series The Story of Minglan, starring Zhao Liying, Zhu Yilong and Feng Shaofeng and directed by Zhang Kaizhou.

In 2019, she starred as Wu Fei, reuniting her with co-star Yao Chen, who played the female lead role, in the drama television series All Is Well, the series was one of the most watched ones in mainland China during its broadcast.

Personal life
On October 27, 2011, Gao openly acknowledged for the first time that she was married and had children. On January 3, 2017, Gao Lu announced on Sina Weibo that she gave birth to a boy.

Filmography

Film

Television

References

External links
 
 

1982 births
Actresses from Beijing
Living people
Central Academy of Drama alumni
Chinese film actresses
Chinese television actresses
21st-century Chinese actresses